The Director General of the Assam Rifles (DGAR) is the head of the Assam Rifles. The DGAR has their office in the Headquarters DGAR at Shillong. Appointed by the Government of India, the DGAR reports to the Minister of Home Affairs. The Director General is an Indian Army Officer of the rank of Lieutenant General and is assisted by three Inspector Generals, each holding the rank of Major General, and other senior officers heading various staff appointments. The Additional Director General of the Assam Rifles who is a Major General - ranked officer serves as the Second-in-command to the Director General. The current Director General, Lieutenant General Pradeep Chandran Nair, AVSM, YSM is the 21st DGAR.

History
The first Director General post-Independence was Mr HG Bartly, CIE, IP who assumed the appointment on 17 September 1947. The first Indian Director General was Colonel Sidhiman Rai, MC appointed on 15 August 1948.
The rank of officers holding the appointment of Director General Assam Rifles has been consistently upgraded from Colonel to Brigadier (One star General) to Major General (Two star General) to Lieutenant General (Three star General) now. Indian Army officers on deputation have been holding the appointment of Director General Assam Rifles until date.

List of directors general

See also
 Assam Rifles
 Special Frontier Force

References

Indian Army
Indian generals
Ministry of Home Affairs (India)
Indian military appointments